Natale Schiavone (25 April 1777 – 15 April 1858) was an Italian painter and engraver, mainly depicting history and portraits. Many of his paintings depict seductive nubile women.

Biography

Early life and training
Schiavoni was born in Chioggia, near Venice, and is claimed by Perkins to be a distant descendant of Andrea Schiavoni's, the Venetian painter. In Venice, he trained with Francesco Maggiotto and later came under the influence of the Neoclassicism.

Career
He was peripatetic, traveling in 1800 to Trieste, and in 1810 to Milan, where he painted Eugène de Beauharnais and the royal family. In Milan, he was able to frequent the studios of Appiani, Longhi, and Sabatelli. In 1816, Schiavoni was invited by the Austrian emperor to Vienna, to become the official portraitist for the court. From there, he returned to Venice in 1821, where he became professor at the Academy of Fine Arts. He resided in the Palazzo Giustinian on the Grand Canal.

He was awarded a gold medal at an exhibition in Brussels. Among his works are a Penitent Magdalene (1852), once displayed in the National Gallery of Berlin; a painting on the same subject at the Vienna Museum; a Bacchante, once 
displayed at the Stadel Gallery in Frankfort; and an Adoration of Shepherds, once displayed at the British Museum, London.

He was described by Pietro Selvatico as in coloring, highly skillful, but in shading, inimitably supreme.

Death
He died in Venice.

Legacy
His sons Felice (1803–68) and Giovanni (1804–48) were also painters of mythology and history. Among his followers was Antonio Zuccaro (1815–1892). Many of his paintings were engraved by Luigi Boscolo.

Gallery

References

1777 births
1858 deaths
18th-century Italian painters
Italian male painters
19th-century Italian painters
Painters from Venice
Italian neoclassical painters
19th-century Italian male artists
18th-century Italian male artists